Gilbert Kennedy, 3rd Earl of Cassilis (12 May 1515 – 15 November 1558) was Scottish landowner, soldier, politician, and judge. He served as Treasurer of Scotland.

Biography

The son of Gilbert Kennedy, 2nd Earl of Cassilis, he succeeded to the titles of 5th Lord Kennedy and 3rd Earl of Cassillis in August 1527. On 6 February 1540/41 he had a charter of the Fief of Cassilis.

As a young man, Kennedy studied at the University of St. Andrews and in Paris under the Scottish humanist George Buchanan for five years.

In November 1542, Kennedy, in his late twenties at the time, was taken prisoner at the Battle of Solway Moss, and after a short stint in the Tower of London, was placed under the care of Thomas Cranmer, Archbishop of Canterbury. Scottish historian Gilbert Burnet (1643-1715) believed that it was this relationship with Cranmer that led Kennedy toward Protestantism, as certainly he was one of the first of the Scottish nobility to adopt Reformed views. However, since his time with Cranmer lasted only one month, it is likely that his earlier contact with Buchanan had been a stronger influence in this regard.

Sir Thomas Wharton, Warden of the English West March, wrote to the Privy Council of King Henry VIII, on the tenth of December 1542, regarding ransoms for prisoners taken at the battle, including the Earl of Cassilis, who was taken by Batill Routlege. Credit was also given to John Musgrave who "claimeth a part for the loan of his horse to the said Routlege".

Cassilis held the office of Treasurer of Scotland in 1554, of Extraordinary Lord of Session between 1546 and 1558.

During the war with England known as the Rough Wooing, Cassilis fought in the Battle of Pinkie Cleugh on 10 September 1547. Two years later, during the siege of Haddington he organised the demolition of East Linton Bridge to hinder English troops.

Cassilis borrowed money from Timothy Cagnioli, an Italian financier, for his expenses as a diplomat in France in 1558. The sum of £6,720 Scots was not repaid in 1586, and Cagnioli claimed it from his grandson, John Kennedy, 5th Earl of Cassilis.

In 1558 he was present, as one of the eight Commissioners appointed by the Scottish Parliament, at the marriage of Mary, Queen of Scots, to the Dauphin of France, to whom the Scottish deputies unanimously refused the Crown matrimonial. The Court of France appeared deeply mortified by this disappointment, and the Earl of Cassilis, with two others of the Commissioners, dying in one night, on 28 November 1558, at Dieppe, a report was raised that they had been poisoned, which was further countenanced by the death of a fourth Commissioner, Lord Fleming, at Paris, on 16 December 1558. However, according to the Dictionary of National Biography, this report was untrue, as the actual dates of death of these persons were not the same, with Cassilis dying in November.

Henry II of France had appointed Gilbert as Gentleman in Ordinary of his Chamber on 4 May 1558, and this honour was transferred to his heir, Gilbert, 4th Earl of Cassilis on 10 February 1559.

Family
In 1540 the Earl married Margaret Kennedy (d. 1580), a daughter of Thomas Kennedy of Bargany and widow of Hugh Wallace of Craigie, and they had five children.
 Lady Katherine Kennedy, who married Sir Patrick Vans of Barnbarroch
 Gilbert Kennedy, 4th Earl of Cassilis (c. 1541–1576)
 Sir Thomas Kennedy, Master of Cassilis (b. between 1543 and 1558, d. 1602). He joined the court of James VI as a gentleman of the bedchamber in October 1580.
 Lady Jean Kennedy (bef. 1558 – c.1598); married Robert Stewart, 1st Earl of Orkney.
 Lady Isobel Kennedy (24 July 1542 – 12 January 1598); married Sir Patrick Mc Elwain of Thomaston Castle and had descendants.

References
Edmund Lodge The Genealogy of the Existing British Peerage, 1859.  at Googe Books

1515 births
1558 deaths
Earls of Cassilis
Gilbert
Treasurers of Scotland
Extraordinary Lords of Session
Converts to Protestantism from Roman Catholicism
Scottish soldiers
Scottish murder victims
Scottish diplomats